Colégio Mateus Ricci is a Roman Catholic kindergarten/preschool through secondary school in Macau and a member of the Macau Catholic Schools Association. It was named after Matteo Ricci and established in 1955. Caritas Macau established the school.

The school has three separate campuses in Santo António (St. Anthony Parish), one for secondary grades, and two for nursery/kindergarten and primary grades.

 the school had almost 2,000 students.

References

External links

 Colégio Mateus Ricci
 Colégio Mateus Ricci 

Catholic schools in China
Schools in Macau
1955 establishments in China
Educational institutions established in 1955